Aleksandar Pantić (born 1 October 1978) is a Serbian former professional footballer who played as a defender.

Club career
After playing for Rad, Zemun, Obilić, Železnik and Voždovac in the First League of Serbia and Montenegro, Pantić signed a four-year contract with Red Star Belgrade in June 2006. He helped the club win the double in the 2006–07 season.

International career
Pantić was capped two times for Serbia and Montenegro, making both appearances at the 2004 Kirin Cup.

Honours
Železnik
 Serbia and Montenegro Cup: 2004–05
Red Star Belgrade
 Serbian SuperLiga: 2006–07
 Serbian Cup: 2006–07

References

External links
 
 
 
 
 

AC Omonia players
Alki Larnaca FC players
Association football defenders
Cypriot First Division players
Expatriate footballers in Bosnia and Herzegovina
Expatriate footballers in Cyprus
First League of Serbia and Montenegro players
FK Dinamo Pančevo players
FK Obilić players
FK Rad players
FK Radnik Surdulica players
FK Rudar Prijedor players
FK Sinđelić Niš players
FK Voždovac players
FK Železnik players
FK Zemun players
People from Prokuplje
Premier League of Bosnia and Herzegovina players
Red Star Belgrade footballers
Serbia and Montenegro footballers
Serbia and Montenegro international footballers
Serbian expatriate footballers
Serbian expatriate sportspeople in Bosnia and Herzegovina
Serbian expatriate sportspeople in Cyprus
Serbian footballers
Serbian SuperLiga players
1978 births
Living people